"Classic Girl" is a song by alternative rock band Jane's Addiction, released on their 1990 album, Ritual de lo Habitual.

Music video
A music video was released for "Classic Girl", that featured clips from the film Gift, directed by and starring frontman Perry Farrell and his then-girlfriend and muse, Casey Niccoli. Gift would eventually be released in 1993. The main scene shown in the video is a Santería-style wedding ceremony between Farrell and Niccoli.

Track listing
 "Then She Did..." - 8:20
 "No One's Leaving (live)" - 3:22
 "Ain't No Right (live)" - 3:22
 "L.A. Medley (live)" - 3:46
 L.A. Woman (Jim Morrison, Robbie Krieger, Ray Manzarek, John Densmore)
 Nausea (John Doe, Exene Cervenka)
 Lexicon Devil (Darby Crash, Pat Smear)
 "Classic Girl" - 5:07

another version 
 "Classic Girl" - 5:07
 "No One's Leaving (live)" - 3:22
 "Ain't No Right (live)" - 3:22

Chart positions

References

Jane's Addiction songs
1990 songs
1991 singles
Songs written by Dave Navarro
Songs written by Perry Farrell
Warner Records singles